Luis Domenech Becerra (born 2 February 1985 in Elda, Valencian Community) is a Spanish footballer who plays for Crevillente Deportivo as a forward.

External links

1985 births
Living people
Spanish footballers
Footballers from the Valencian Community
Association football forwards
Segunda División players
Segunda División B players
Tercera División players
CD Eldense footballers
Elche CF Ilicitano footballers
Elche CF players
CD Alcoyano footballers
Benidorm CF footballers
SD Ponferradina players
UD Melilla footballers
Yeclano Deportivo players
CD Guijuelo footballers
People from Elda
Sportspeople from the Province of Alicante